Dewitt Airport or DeWitt Airport may refer to:

 Dewitt Field, also known as Old Town Municipal Airport, in Old Town, Maine, United States
 DeWitt Municipal Airport in DeWitt, Arkansas, United States
 General DeWitt Spain Airport in Memphis, Tennessee, United States